Pakhar is a rural locality (a village) and the administrative centre of Donskoy Selsoviet, Belebeyevsky District, Bashkortostan, Russia. The population was 414 as of 2010. There are 5 streets.

Geography 
Pakhar is located 17 km southeast of Belebey (the district's administrative centre) by road. Annenkovo is the nearest rural locality.

References 

Rural localities in Belebeyevsky District